Carlo Otte (born 20 May 1908; date of death unknown) was a German Nazi administrator.

During World War II he chaired the economy section of Reichskommissariat Norwegen, and was Josef Terboven's adviser on economical issues. By holding this position, he had significant influence on Norwegian economy during the German occupation of Norway.

References

Further reading

External links
 

1908 births
Year of death missing
German people of World War II
German expatriates in Norway